San Ramón (Spanish for "Saint Ramón") is a commune of Chile located in Santiago Province, Santiago Metropolitan Region; part of Greater Santiago.

Demographics
The population fell by 5.9% (5,911 persons) between the 1992 and 2002 censuses.

Stats
Average annual household income: US$23,878 (PPP, 2006)
Population below poverty line: 16.7% (2006)
Regional quality of life index: 70.19, mid-low, 42 out of 52 (2005)
Human Development Index: 0.679, 170 out of 341 (2003)

Administration
As a commune, San Ramón is a third-level administrative division of Chile administered by a municipal council, headed by an alcalde who is directly elected every four years. The 2012-2016 alcalde is Miguel Ángel Aguilera Sanhueza (PS). The communal council has the following members:
 Mónica Aguilera Sanhueza (PS)
 Genaro Balladares Schwaner (DC)
 Claudia Lange Farias (UDI)
 Sylvia Reyes Terán (DC)
 Max Pardo Ramirez (PC)
 Julio Soto Martinez (PRI)
 Roxana Riquelme Tabach (PS)
 Manuel Arzola Bustamante (PPD)

Within the electoral divisions of Chile, San Ramón is represented in the Chamber of Deputies by Mr. Tucapel Jiménez (PPD) and Mr. Iván Moreira (UDI) as part of the 27th electoral district, (together with El Bosque and La Cisterna). The commune is represented in the Senate by Soledad Alvear Valenzuela (PDC) and Pablo Longueira Montes (UDI) as part of the 8th senatorial constituency (Santiago-East).

References

External links
  Municipality of San Ramón

Populated places in Santiago Province, Chile
Communes of Chile
Geography of Santiago, Chile
Populated places established in 1984